List of archaeological sites in County Tyrone, Northern Ireland:

 

A
Aghafad, Rath, grid ref: H4603 5800
Aghagogan, Wedge tomb, grid ref: H6391 7360 and standing stone, grid ref: H6398 7351
Aghalane, Standing stone, stone circle, alignments and cist, grid ref: H4946 9260
Aghalane, Court tomb: Cloghogle, grid ref: H5473 7854
Aghaloo Church, in Rousky townland, grid ref: H6634 5494
Aghalunny, Bridge: Fairy Bridge, grid ref: H1695  7985
Aghascrebagh, Prehistoric burial monument: ‘Pagan Graveyard’, grid ref: H6162 8381
Aghascrebagh, Ogham stone, grid ref: H6178 8390
Aghascrebagh, Standing stone, grid ref: H6166 8397
Aghintain, Fortified house, grid ref: H4985 5151
Aghnagreggan, Court tomb, grid ref: H4985 5151
Aghnahoo and Leitrim, Souterrain, grid ref: H2263 8032
Ally, Court tomb, grid ref: H2570 7242
Altanagh, Burial mound, grid ref: H6266 6936
Altcloghfin, Portal tomb, grid ref: H5643 6244
Altdrumman, Portal tomb: Cloghogle, grid ref: H5778 7679
Altdrumman, Wedge tomb and court tomb, grid ref: H5588 7626
Altmore (alias Barracktown), Megalith, grid ref: H6710 6936 and court tomb, grid ref: H6686 6961
Annagh, Rectangular earthwork, H5083 6651
Annagh More, Crannog, grid ref: H6988 5465
Ardboe High Cross, Ecclesiastical site: environs of Ardboe Cross and abbey, Farsnagh and Sessia townland, grid ref: H9660 7562
Aughnacarney, Rath, grid ref:H5540 5164

B
Balix Lower, Cashel, grid ref: H4921 9757
Balix Lower, Court tomb: ‘The White Rocks’ (area surrounding the state care monument), grid ref: H4836 9635
Ballyclog Old Church, Church, Glebe townland, grid ref: H8660 7369
Ballygawley Castle, grid ref: H6324 5749
Ballygowan, Counterscarp raths (2), grid refs: H4297 7235 and H4344 7191
Ballykeery, Killeen, grid ref: H4492 9540
Ballynabwee, Counterscarp rath, grid ref: C4090 0500
Ballynamallaght, Prehistoric landscape, standing stone, cairns and field walls, grid ref: Area of H510 988
Ballynatubbrit, Ring barrow, grid ref: H4469 8331
Ballyness, Standing stone, grid ref: H4592 5312
Ballyrenan, Portal tomb: Cloghogle, grid ref: H3732 8317
Ballywholan, Court tomb: ‘Carnagat’ (area surrounding the state care monument), grid ref: H5786 8166
Beaghmore, Cairns (2), grid refs: H6872 8470 and H6856 8472
Beaghmore, Stone circles, alignments and cairns, grid ref: Area of H684 842
Beaghmore, Round cairn with standing stones: Bradley's Cairn, grid ref: H6830 8401
Beaghmore, Cairn and alignment, grid ref: H6863 8431
Beleevna Beg, Concentric stone circles, grid ref: H6192 8296
Beltany, Court tomb, grid ref: H4168 8262
Beltrim, Stone circle and standing stones, grid ref: H4814 8464
Beragh, Standing stone complex, grid ref: H3919 8122
Berrysfort, Standing stone (area surrounding the state care monument), grid ref: H2719 8382
Bloomhill, Rath, grid ref: H5915 5659
Bodoney, Rath, grid ref: H3181 6517
Branny, Hilltop enclosure, grid ref: H6826 5556
Broughderg, Court tomb: Carnanagarranbane, grid ref: H6465 8623
Broughderg, Stone circle and alignment, grid ref: H6593 8714
Broughderg, Stone circles, alignments and cairn, grid ref: H6496 8613
Broughderg, Two stone circles and a standing stone, grid ref: H6535 8482
Broughderg, Megalithic tomb, grid ref: H6440 8636
Broughderg, Cist burial and associated features, grid ref: H6772 8697
Bullock Park, Portal tomb, grid ref: H2778 7892

C
Cabragh, Large enclosure: Cabragh Fort, grid ref: H2695 5670
Cadian, Sweat house, grid ref: H7679 5566
Caldragh Children's Burial Ground, Foremass Lower townland, grid ref: H5837 6607
Caledon Cross, in Demesne townland, grid ref: H7545 4372
Caledon, Beam engine, grid ref: H7581 4521
Camowen, Rath, grid ref: H4924 6844
Camus, Church, grid ref: H3473 9160
Cappagh Church, in Dunmullan townland, grid ref: H4493 8021
Carnanransy, Court tomb: Cloghmore, grid ref: H6246 8550
Carncorran Glebe, Portal tomb: Giant's Grave, grid ref: H2889 8243
Carnteel, Church, grid ref: H6944 5460
Carr, Platform rath, grid ref: H5469 5399
Carrickayne, Prehistoric landscape, stone circle, alignments and cairns, grid ref: Area of H526 988
Carrickayne, Prehistoric landscape, cairns and field walls, grid ref: Area of H516 985
Carrickmore, Graveyard: Relignaman or Relicknaman, grid ref: H6064 7224
Carrickmore, Graveyard: Relignalaniv, grid ref: H6137 7273
Carrigans, Court tomb, grid ref: H4218 8076
Carryglass, Multiple cist cairn: Carnamoghil, grid ref: H3839 5575
Carryglass, Standing stone: Garranbane, grid ref: H3932 5590
Carryglass, Wedge tomb and cist, grid ref: H3883 5614
Cashel, Standing stone: ‘Cloghacarah’, grid ref: H5786 8166
Cashel, Portal tomb, grid ref: H5794 8106
Castle Curlews, in Kirlish townland, grid ref: H3196 7579 
Castledamph, Rath, grid ref: H5206 9174
Castledamph, Stone circles and stone alignment, grid ref: H5216 9236
Castlederg Castle, Bawn, Castlesessagh townland, grid ref: H2605 8442
Castlemervyn Demesne, Stone circle, grid ref: H3363 5740
Castletown, Ring barrow, grid ref: H7054 5631
Castletown, Eel weir and associated features, grid ref: H7076 8561
Cavanreagh, Barrow, grid ref: H6108 6699
Cavanreagh, Standing stones, grid ref: H6090 6701
Churchtown, Wedge tomb: ‘Todd’s Den’ (area surrounding the state care monument), grid ref: H2688 8565
Clady Haliday, Court tomb: Carnmore, grid ref: H3423 8874
Clare, Court tomb: White Stones, grid ref: H5913 7393
Clogher Demesne, Ecclesiastical site and high crosses: Clochar Mac nDiameni, grid ref: H5376 5156
Clogher Demesne, Clogher Hillfort (area surrounding the state care monument), grid ref: H5387 5133
Clogher Demesne, Large hilltop enclosure, grid ref: H5478 5050
Clogherny, Wedge tomb, grid ref: H4882 9453
Clogherny, Stone circles, grid ref: H4925 9480
Clogherny, Crannog, grid ref: H7641 5660
Clogherny Glebe, Raths (3), grid refs: H5741 9165, H5780 9195 and H5852 9221
Cloghfin, Portal tomb, grid ref: H5186 7218
Cloghfin, Rath, grid ref: H6042 6637
Cloghfin, Standing stones (3), H6024 6736
Cloghfin, Standing stone (fallen), grid ref: H5990 6725
Cloghog, Rectangular enclosure – artillery fort?, grid ref: H8711 6683
Clonfeacle Cross, in Tullydowey townland, grid ref: H8387 5212
Coalisland Canal, Coalisland Canal basin (part of) and canal reaches (3)
Coalisland, Colliery chimney, in Annagher townland, grid ref: H8468 6713
Coalisland, Coalisland Works Chimneys (4), Brackaville and Annagher townlands, grid ref: H4829 6657
Copney, Stone circles (8), stone circle complex, grid ref: H599 780
Copney, Stone circles (2) and alignments, grid ref: H5939 7826
Corboe, Rath, grid ref: H5158 5768
Corick, Rath and tree-ring, grid ref: H5453 5297
Corick Abbey, Friary, Corickmore townland, grid ref: H4519 8817
Corramore, Platform rath, grid ref: H5917 9238
Corramore, Rath, grid ref: H5878 9229
Crannogue, Fortified mound, grid ref: H6839 6762
Cranny, Rath, grid ref: H4739 7246
Creevelough, Rath, grid ref: H7466 5330
Cregganconroe, Stone circle, alignment and cairn, grid ref: H6504 7523
Cregganconroe, Stone circles (2), cairns (2) and alignment, grid ref: H6479 7521
Creggandevesky, Portal tomb, H6391 7524
Creggandevesky, Stone structure, grid ref: H6285 7389
Crew, Platform rath, grid ref: H6056 5731
Crew Lower, Standing stones, grid ref: H3151 8480
Crocknafarbrague, Cairn: Carnacalleen, grid ref: H3838 5605
Crocknafarbrague, Standing stone – possible megalithic tomb, grid ref: H3796 5522
Crosh, Portal tomb: Cloghogle, grid ref: H4176 8791
Crouck, Megalithic tomb, grid ref: H6220 8445
Crouck, Fulacht fiadh (cooking place), grid ref: H6239 8433
Cullamore, Court tomb: Giant's Grave, grid ref: H5809 4839
Culvacullion, Stone circles and alignment: ‘standing stones’, grid ref: H4949 8892
Culvacullion, Stone circle, grid ref: H4928 8933

D
Davagh Lower, wedge tomb: "Big Man's Grave", grid ref: H7013 9708
Davagh Lower, Ring cairn, stone circle and alignments, grid ref: H7047 8674
Deer Park (McCormick), Platform rath, grid ref: H4259 7270
Deer Park (McCormick), Boulder with hollows: Cloghanachorite, grid ref: H4299 7285
Deer Park (McCormick), Court tomb, grid ref: H4305 7264
Dergbrough, ráth, grid ref: H4692 8994
Dernabane, large enclosure, grid ref: H6632, 5384
Derryallen, standing stones (3), grid ref: H3088 5313
Derrydrummond, court tomb: "Giant's Graves", grid ref: H5737 4850
Derrywoone Castle, Baronscourt townland, grid ref: H3669 8357
Donaghenry, standing stone, grid ref: H8353 7206
Doocrock, court tomb, grid ref: H2764 6219
Doorat, stone circles (2), grid ref: H4926 9689
Doorat, stone circles (2), standing stone and alignment, grid ref: H4952 9652
Doorless, ráth, grid ref: H8380 7650
Dromore, Church, grid ref: H3491 6276
Drumgormal, bivallate ráth, grid ref: H8735 6984
Drumragh, Church, grid ref: H4568 6980
Drumsonnus, henge, grid ref: H2805 5380
Dunbunrawer, ráth, grid ref: H4626 8605
Dundivin Glebe, ráths (2), grid ref: H4467 5766
Dungannon Castle, site of, in Drumcoo townland, grid ref: H7990 6262
Dungororan, ráth (area surrounding the state care monument), grid ref: H7387 6931
Dunmisk, enclosure: "Dunmisk Fort", grid ref: H6279 7074
Dunmore, mound: moat (Lough Fea), grid ref: H7603 8659
Dunnalong, fortified town: Dunnalong Fort, grid ref: Area of C378 105
Dunnamore wedge tomb (:de:Wedge Tomb von Dunnamore): "Dermot and Grania's Bed", Dunnamore townland, grid ref: H6860 8090
Dun Ruadh (Doonroe), multiple cist cairn and henge, Crouck townland, grid ref: H6232 8453
Durless White, ráth, grid ref: H6040 5145

E
Edenageeragh, Rath: Lismalore Fort, grid ref: H6966 5249
Errigal, Rath, grid ref: H5823 5645
Evish, Wedge tomb, grid ref: H3923 9678

F
Farsnagh and Sessia, Ruined structure, grid ref: H9673 7573
Favor Royal Demesne, Bivallate raths (2), grid refs: H6060 5290 and H6128 5215
Feegarran, Wedge tomb, grid ref: H7726 8225
Feegarran, Trackway, grid ref: H7664 8265
Findermore, Cross-carved standing stone: Abbey Stone, grid ref: H5176 5124
Fintona, Church ruins, in Castletown townland, grid ref: H4447 6143
Freughlough, Standing stone, grid ref: H2620 8530
Freughmore, Large hilltop enclosure, grid ref: H4655 6750

G
Garvagh, Cashel, grid ref: H2031 8460
Garvagh, Court tomb: County Carn, grid ref: H2016 8694
Garvaghullion, Bronze Age wooden trackway, grid ref: H3680 7667
Glasdrummond, Court tomb, grid ref: H7083 5509
Glasmullagh, Wedge tomb: Dermot and Grania's Bed, grid ref: H3873 8050
Glasmullagh, Four stone circles and a stone alignment, grid ref: H3868 8041
Glenchuil, Passage tomb (sometimes known as Glenchuil Fort), grid ref: H6030 5828
Glencull, Cross-head, grid ref: H6830 5321
Glengeen, Multiple cist cairn, grid ref: H3712 5687
Glengeen, Stone circle, grid ref: H3804 5608
Glenkeen, platform rath, grid ref: H7049  4961
Glenknock, Portal tomb: ‘Cloghogle’ (area around the state care monument), grid ref: H4117 8794
Glenlark, Rath, grid ref: H5718 8743
Glenmacoffer, Standing stones (2), grid ref: H5299 8629
Glennan, rath, grid ref: H3977 6614
Glennoo, Church, graveyard and bullaun: Killycawna, grid ref: H4960 4288
Glenroan, Portal tomb and wedge tomb: Dermot and Grania's Bed, grid ref: H5485 9145
Golan, Stone circle and stone alignment, grid ref: H4399 8193
Golan, Henge, grid ref: H6616 5677
Gortalowry, Rath, grid ref: H8086 7738
Gortatray, Trivallate enclosure, grid ref: H8595 7051
Gortmerron, Fragment of Romanesque arch, grid ref: H7738 5356
Gortnagarn, Court tomb, grid ref: H6686 7122
Granagh, Court tomb, grid ref: H6087 7639
Grange, Standing stone (area surrounding the state care monument), grid ref: H8317 7477
Grange, Standing stones (2) (area surrounding the state care monument), grid ref: H8306 7514

H
Holywell Church, Church, graveyard and carved stone, in Lackagh* townland, grid ref: H3132 7425

I
Island McHugh, Crannog and fortification, Baronscourt townland, grid ref: H3646 8378

K
Keady, Platform rath, grid ref: H5905 5641
Keerin, Portal tomb, grid ref: H6418 8656
Keerin, Court tomb, grid ref: H6376 8607
Kilcroagh, Standing stone: the White Stone, grid ref: H2554 8487
Kilknock, Wedge tomb, grid ref: H3725 5420
Kilknock, Large hilltop enclosure, ‘Crockroe’, grid ref: H3697 5498
Killadroy, Rath, grid ref: H5219 6194
Killeter, Court tomb, grid ref: H1939 7872
Killeter, Double stone alignment, grid ref: H1939 7872
Killoan, Decorated cross-base: the Headstone, grid ref: H2967 7530
Killucan, Wedge tomb: Carnanbane (area surrounding the state care monument), grid ref: H6833 7925
Killucan, Long cairn (area surrounding the state care monument), grid ref: H6848 8012
Killyliss, Bivallate rath, grid ref: H4104 6084
Killyliss, Rath: Killyliss fort (area surrounding the state care monument), grid ref: H7569 6056
Killymoon Demesne, Court tomb, grid ref: H8232 7686
Killymore, Rath: Attyhole Fort, grid ref: H4333 8658
Killynaght, Portal tomb, grid ref: C3909 0113
Kilnagrew, Crannog, grid ref: H8082 5397
Knockaginny, Rath, grid ref: H7265 4625
Knocknahorna, Stone circle, grid ref: H4105 9890

L
Laghtmorris, Possible cashel, grid ref: H1860 8435
Legland, Court tomb, grid ref: H3613 7963
Leitrim, Portal tomb: Druid's Altar, grid ref: H2250 8000
Leitrim, Hillfort, grid ref: H2205 8020
Letterbrat, Portal tomb, grid ref: H4715 9156
Lettergash, Rath: Lettergash Fort, grid ref: H3028 6203
Lettery, Stone alignment, megalithic tomb and associated features, grid ref: H2860 6613
Lisconrea, Two megalithic structures, grid ref: H3930 5670
Lisconrea, Ring barrow, grid ref: H3946 5674
Lisdoart, Platform rath, grid ref: H6235 5565
Lisgobban, Bivallate rath: Lisgobban Fort, grid ref: H8108 5485
Liskincon, Rath, grid ref: H5629 6763
Lisky, Court tomb (area surrounding the state care monument), grid ref: H3575 9051
Lislane, Wedge tombs (2), grid refs: H4747 5363 and H4689 5596
Lismore, Rath, grid ref: H6196 5447
Lismore, Favor Royal Bawn, grid ref: H6316 5380
Lisnagleer, Standing stone: ‘Clogh Corr’, grid ref: H7850 6763
Lisnaragh Irish, Rath, grid ref: C4569 0025
Lissan, Rath: Birch Hill, grid ref: H7939 8203
Lissan, Counterscarp rath, grid ref: H7899 8254
Loughash, Wedge tomb: Cashelbane, grid ref: C5162 0130
Loughash, Wedge tomb: Giant's Grave, grid ref: C4834 0080
Loughmacrory, Court tomb: Carnanbane, grid ref: H5778 7773
Loughmacrory, Wedge tomb: Dermot and Grania's bed, grid ref: H5862 7765
Loughmacrory, Court tomb, grid ref: H5854 7701
Loughry, Rath, grid ref: H8132 7410
Loughry, Wedge tomb: Giant's Grave, grid ref: H8124 7487
Loughry, Bronze Age settlement  and ring ditch, grid ref: H8139 7498
Lungs, Earthwork: oval platform and terrace, grid ref: H5050 5106
Lurganboy, Wedge tomb, grid ref: H4157 8267

M
Magheraglass, Church and enclosure (area surrounding the state care monument), grid ref: H7437 7677
Magherakeel, Church, grid ref: H1841 7971
Mallabeny, Hillfort, grid ref: H5079 5411
Martray, Rath: Martray Fort, grid ref: H6457 5893
Meenagorp, Megalithic tomb, grid ref: H4520 9160
Meendamph, Standing stone and stone circle, grid ref: H4579 9755
Mountcastle, Plantation castle, grid ref: C4175 0515
Moymore, Rath, grid ref: H7169 7394
Moymore, Stone circles (9) and alignments, grid ref: H7104 7452
Moymore, Barrow, grid ref: H7035 7508
Mullaghmore, Rath: H7830 6493
Mullaghslin Glebe, Bivallate rath, grid ref: H5628 7261
Mullanabreen, Cashel, grid ref: H2005 8242
Mullanabreen, Rath, grid ref: H2021 8183
Mullanahoe, Souterrain, grid ref: H9335 7483
Mullanmore, Wedge tomb: Labby Dermot, grid ref: H5913 7617
Mullans, Rath, grid ref: H5675 5278
Mullaghwotragh, Windmill, grid ref: H9203 7715
Mulnafye, Round cairn, grid ref: H5423 7761
Mulnagore, Hut platform, grid ref: H7668 6894
Muntober, Rath: the Black Fort, grid ref: H7442 8161
Murnells, Portal tomb and long cairn: Dermot and Grania's Bed and round cairn, grid ref: H6796  7569

N
Newtownstewart, Castle site (mound and foundation): Pigeon Hill, Croshballinfree townland, grid ref: H4036 8578

O
Oughtboy, Stone alignments, grid ref: H5959 9377
Oughtdoorish, Rath, grid ref: H5875 9253

R
Radergan, Megalithic tomb: Grania's Grave, grid ref: H5544 6434
Reaghan, Two stone circles, standing stone and possible cairn, grid ref: H4409 8185
Reloagh, Crannogs, grid ref: H7613 6589
Roughan Castle, Castle, in Roughan townland, grid ref: H8231 6830
Roughan and Tullagh Beg, Crannog, grid ref: H8277 6868

S
Scraghy, Stone circle or cairn kerb: Druid's Circle, grid ref: H2088 7423
Scraghy, Standing stones (2), grid ref: H2213 7383
Scraghy, Portal tomb, grid ref: H2216 7387
Seskinore, Platform rath, grid ref: H4913 6360
Seskinore, Rath, grid ref: H4876 6335
Sessagh of Gallan, Killeen, grid ref: H4079 8965
Sessia, Rath, grid ref: H5657 5296
Sessiamagaroll, Rath and motte: Sessiamagaroll Fort, grid ref: H8120 5404
Sess Kilgreen, Passage tomb: standing stones (2), grid ref: H6051 5868
Sess Kilgreen, Mound, grid ref: H6028 5883
Sess Kilgreen, Passage tomb: decorated standing stone, grid ref: H6026 5860
Sess Kilgreen, Passage tomb, grid ref: H6041 5845
Sess Kilgreen, Megalithic tomb, grid ref: H6035 5854
Shanmaghry, Wedge tomb, grid ref: H7065 6850
Shantavny Irish, Passage tomb, grid ref: H6018 5969
Stantavny Scotch, Wedge tomb, grid ref: H5814 6059
Sixmilecross, Platform rath, grid ref: H5630 6762
Slaghtfreeden, Megalithic tomb: Giant's Grave and ‘cairns’, grid ref: H7410 8728
Stakernagh, Crannog in Lough Aughlish, grid ref: H7435 6238
Stewart Castle, in Newtownstewart, Castle and bawn, grid ref: H4023 8582
Stewartstown, Castle and village, Castle Farm townland, grid ref: H8599 7077
Strabane Canal, Strabane Canal Reach 1, Ballydonaghy and Leckpatrick townlands, grid ref: C3594 0391 – C3606 0262
Strabane Canal, Strabane Canal Reach 2, Greenlaw, Strabane Bog, Woodend and Desert townlands, grid ref: C3605 0262 – C3489 9957
Strabane Canal, Strabane Canal Reach 3, Greenbrae and Town Parks townlands, grid ref: C3445 9832 – C3462 9895
Stranagummer, large hilltop enclosure, grid ref: H3049 5632
Streefe Glebe, Court tomb: Oweyanivore, grid ref: H5440 7535

T
Tattycor, Rath, grid ref: H3976 6232
Tattykeel, Standing stone (area surrounding state care monument), grid ref: H7480 7738
Tattykeel, Megalithic tomb, grid ref: H7455 7752
Tievenny, Platform rath: Tievenny Fort, grid ref: H3178 8558
Tievenny, Platform rath, grid ref: H3206 8626
Tirkernaghan, 17th century house, grid ref: C4454 0032
Tonnagh More, Rath, grid ref: H4020 5967
Tremoge, Stone circles (2) and double alignment, grid ref: H6538 7330
Tremoge, Stone circles (3) and alignment, grid ref: H6574 7368
Trillick Castle, in Castlemervyn Demesne townland, grid ref: H3354 5758
Tullycunny, Rath, grid ref: H4330 6731
Tullydowey, Artillery fort: Mullan Fort, grid ref: H8395 5174
Tullygiven, Crannog, grid ref: H7761 5263
Tullyhogue Fort, Inauguration site, Ballymully Glebe townland, grid ref: H8251 7428
Tycanny, Large hilltop enclosure, grid ref: H5621 5804

U
Urney Glebe, Ecclesiastical site and cross carved slab: Ernaidhe, grid ref: H3034 9491

W
Windyhill, Wedge tomb, grid ref: C4016 0229

References
The main reference for all sites listed is: NI Environment Agency, Scheduled Historic Monuments (to 15 October 2012), unless otherwise indicated.

 
Tyrone
County Tyrone
Archaeological